Roberto Daniel Gasparini  (born 5 January 1958 in Córdoba) is a former Argentine footballer. He is currently working as the manager of Estudiantes de Río Cuarto in the lower leagues of Argentine football.

Life
Gasparini started his professional career in 1978 with Racing de Córdoba . In 1980 they reached the final of the Nacional championship only to lose to Rosario Central.

In 1986 Gasparini moved to Rosario Central, he was part of their championship winning team in the 1986-1987 season.

Gasparini moved to Mexico in 1989 to play for Necaxa, Tigres de la UANL and  Monterrey . He returned to Argentina in 1995, he played for  Talleres de Córdoba  and then  Estudiantes de Río Cuarto, retiring in 1996.

Titles

External links
 
 Puntal article

1958 births
Living people
Footballers from Córdoba, Argentina
Argentine people of Italian descent
Argentine footballers
Association football midfielders
Racing de Córdoba footballers
Rosario Central footballers
Tigres UANL footballers
C.F. Monterrey players
Club Necaxa footballers
Talleres de Córdoba footballers
Argentine football managers
Argentine Primera División players
Liga MX players
Expatriate footballers in Mexico
Argentine expatriate footballers
Argentine expatriate sportspeople in Mexico
Estudiantes de Río Cuarto footballers
Pan American Games medalists in football
Medalists at the 1979 Pan American Games
Footballers at the 1979 Pan American Games
Pan American Games bronze medalists for Argentina